Rhode Island Medical Society  is a medical society founded in 1812.  It is the eighth oldest state medical society in the United States.

They have published the Rhode Island Medical Journal since 1917.

From 1912 to 2002, their headquarters was located in the Rhode Island Medical Society Building in Providence, Rhode Island.

References

External links
 Official website
 Act Establishing the Rhode Island Medical Society

Medical associations based in the United States
1812 establishments in Rhode Island
Medical and health organizations based in Rhode Island